This is a list of episodes from the fourth and final season of The Many Loves of Dobie Gillis; the series' title was changed to Max Shulman's Dobie Gillis during this season.

This season continues with the misadventures of Dobie Gillis and his best friend Maynard G. Krebs at Central City's S. Peter Pryor Junior College, Dobie continuing to deal with life with his parents, Herbert and Winifred Gillis, and working in (or trying not to work in) his father's grocery store. Two new recurring characters were added: Virgil Gillis, Herbert's dishonest would-be music star cousin from Tennessee, and Duncan "Dunky" Gillis, Dobie's cousin and Herbert's nephew, who comes to live with the Gillis family and becomes Maynard's running partner.

Sheila James and William Schallert left Dobie Gillis before the start of the fourth season; Schallert to star in the pilot for Philbert and James to star in the pilot for a Dobie Gillis spinoff, Zelda. Both shows went unsold, and James returned to Dobie on a freelance basis for four episodes towards the end of this final season.

Broadcast history
The season originally aired Wednesdays at 8:30-9:00 pm (EST) on CBS from September 26, 1962 to June 5, 1963, moving from its original Tuesday at 8:30pm slot. The series fell out of the Top 30 during this season and was cancelled by CBS in spring 1963.

DVD release
The entire series was released on DVD by Shout! Factory.

Cast

Main
 Dwayne Hickman as Dobie Gillis
 Frank Faylen as Herbert T. Gillis (28 episodes)
 Florida Friebus as Winifred "Winnie" Gillis (19 episodes)
 Bob Denver as Maynard G. Krebs

Recurring
 Ray Hemphill as Cousin Virgil Gillis (3 episodes)
 Bobby Diamond as Duncan "Dunky" Gillis (7 episodes)
 Sheila James as Zelda Gilroy (4 episodes)
 Steve Franken as Chatsworth Osborne, Jr. (4 episodes)
 Doris Packer as Mrs. Chatsworth Osbourne, Sr. (5 episodes)
 Jean Byron as Dr. Imogene Burkhart (10 episodes)
 Tuesday Weld as Thalia Menninger (1 special guest appearance)

Episodes

References

External links
 

1962 American television seasons
1963 American television seasons
4